This article lists the missile squadrons of the United States Air Force. There are nine missile squadrons currently active in the United States (listed in bold type); all nine are equipped to operate intercontinental ballistic missiles.

Aerodynamic missile squadrons

Ballistic missile squadrons

See also
 6555th Aerospace Test Group
 List of United States Air Force squadrons

References

 
 U.S. Air Force Tactical Missiles, (2009), George Mindling, Robert Bolton

External links

TAC Missileers – Matador and Mace Missileers

Nuclear cruise missiles of the United States
Cruise missiles of the Cold War
Nuclear missiles of the Cold War
Missile